David Griffith Lalloo (born 1960) is a British parasitologist, and the director of the Liverpool School of Tropical Medicine since January 2019, and Professor of Tropical Medicine there.

Lalloo trained as a doctor in Newcastle upon Tyne.

References

Living people
British parasitologists
1960 births
Date of birth missing (living people)
Place of birth missing (living people)
Academics of the Liverpool School of Tropical Medicine